The role of religion in the 2022 Russian invasion of Ukraine, along with the impact the invasion has had on religion, have attracted significant attention. Peter Mandaville of the United States Institute of Peace has stated that "the conflict in Ukraine is not only a matter of horrible violence, but also a conflict with deeply rooted religious significance."

Orthodox Christianity

Orthodox church in Russia 
Patriarch Kirill of Moscow, the head of the Russian Orthodox Church, has been described by many commentators as supporting the invasion. In a Forgiveness Sunday sermon on 6 March, he stated that the invasion would determine "which side of God humanity will be on," saying that Western governments were attempting to destroy the separatist Donetsk People's Republic and Luhansk People's Republic for rejecting Western "so-called values," such as LGBT+ rights.

However, some priests in the Russian Orthodox Church have publicly opposed the invasion, with some facing arrest under the new Russian law criminalising discrediting the armed forces.

Kristina Stoeckl of the University of Innsbruck has stated that "this war and the justifications given by the Russian president and the head of the church for the military aggression have made clear how closely the Orthodox Church and the state are linked in Russia." Georg Michels of the University of California, Riverside has argued that "the Russian Orthodox Church is providing much of the symbolism and ideology that Putin has used to cement his popularity" and that this symbolism "derives from the Kremlin’s mythologization of Russia’s historical past." The links between the Russian Orthodox Church and the Russian government under Vladimir Putin have led some commentators to describe the invasion as a religious war.

Some commentators have pointed to Russian Christian nationalism as playing a role in the Russian government's motivations for the invasion. Jason Stanley of Yale University argued that the invasion was in part motivated by antisemitism, saying that Putin was "the leader of Russian Christian nationalism" and "has come to view himself as the global leader of Christian nationalism, and is increasingly regarded as such by Christian nationalists around the world." Mark Silk of Trinity College has argued that it would be overstating it to call the invasion a religious war, but that "there can be no doubt that, under Putin, the Russian Orthodox Church has resumed its czarist role as an arm of state policy," calling it the political religion of Russian Orthodox nationalism.

Splits with the Russian Orthodox Church 

The invasion of Ukraine, and the Russian Orthodox Church's seeming support for it has caused controversy among Orthodox churches elsewhere in the world. The invasion has been condemned by Bartholomew I of Constantinople, and by Patriarch Daniel of Romania, Patriarch Theodore II of Alexandria, and Archbishop Leo of Helsinki and All Finland.

On 13 March, the Parish of Saint Nicholas of Myra in Amsterdam, in the Netherlands, announced that it would be disaffiliating from the Russian Orthodox Church due to its support of the invasion, to instead affiliate with the Ecumenical Patriarchate of Constantinople.

On 17 March, Archbishop Innokentiy, head of the Lithuanian Orthodox Church, announced that the Church would "strive for an even greater independence" from the Russian Orthodox Church, condemning the invasion.

Other Christianity 
The day after the invasion began, The Church of Jesus Christ of Latter-day Saints said that it would "pray that this armed conflict will end quickly" and "that the controversies will end peacefully," but did not directly refer to either Ukraine or Russia in the statement.

Pope Francis, head of the Roman Catholic Church, has condemned the invasion. On 16 March, Pope Francis and Patriarch Kirill held a video meeting to discuss the invasion for the first time. Afterwards, they released a joint statement saying they "stressed the exceptional importance of the ongoing negotiation process, expressing their hope for the soonest achievement of a just peace." Claire Giangravé of Religious News Service has argued that the invasion has "set back the clock on overcoming the Christian divide between East and West."

Judaism 
Ukrainian President Volodymyr Zelenskyy is Jewish.

Haaretz has reported that the Russian government has pressured Russian Jewish institutions to speak in favour of the invasion, including with threats of retaliation if those institutions did not. Some Jewish Russian opposition figures have been targeted with antisemitic threats due to their opposition to the war, including Alexei Venediktov.

the Chief Rabbi of Kyiv, Rabbi Jonathan Markovitch has pledged to care for those who are unable to flee as Russian forces continue their assault on Ukraine’s capital.
he went to dozens of countries (Washington DC, Israel, England, ETC') to help Ukraine with humanitarian aid

Islam 
Islam is a prominent minority faith in Russia, and some Muslims in that country have given theological justifications for supporting the invasion of Ukraine. Magomed Khitanev, a Muslim military commander, described the Russian invasion as a “holy jihad” and said “We’re on the side of God! We are defending divine laws. We are defending our faith. We're asking: Oh Ukrainians, why did you permit gay parades in Kyiv, Kharkiv and Odesa?" Khitanev also falsely accused Pope Francis, who opposes the invasion, of officially endorsing gay marriage and gender transition and claimed that the “Roman Pope officially opened the temple of Satan.” The event featuring Khitanev and Vladimir Solovyov was widely broadcast on Russian state TV.

Other religions 
The current Dalai Lama expressed “anguish” over the bloodshed in Ukraine, saying that “war is outdated” and calling for a quick return to peace.

See also 
 Religion in Ukraine
 Religion in Russia
 Consecration of Russia

References

2022 Russian invasion of Ukraine